Bruno Lança de Andrade (born February 18, 1983 in São Paulo) is a Brazilian footballer.

An Atlético Paranaense youth product, he signed a new two-year contract for Paranaense in March 2005. On 31 August 2005, he left for Reggina. Bruno returned to Brazil for Santa Cruz of Campeonato Brasileiro Série A. In February 2007, he left for Wuhan of Chinese Super League, and played as 布鲁诺.

On 22 February 2008, he signed a contract until the end of Campeonato Paulista for Mirassol.

External links
SambaFoot
 CBF
 Profile & Statistics at Guardian's Stats Centre

1983 births
Living people
Brazilian footballers
Brazilian expatriate footballers
Expatriate footballers in Italy
Reggina 1914 players
Serie A players
Association football midfielders
Footballers from São Paulo
Club Athletico Paranaense players
Esporte Clube Juventude players
Santa Cruz Futebol Clube players
Mirassol Futebol Clube players
Esporte Clube Noroeste players
Paysandu Sport Club players
Volta Redonda FC players